Incidence is a minimalist golfing style game by ScrollView Games. It was released on iOS on March 1, 2017.

Gameplay 
The goal of each level of Incidence is to get a ball into a hole in a set number of shots (4 shots to be precise). The player launches the ball by dragging back (which sets the power and angle of the shot). Once the ball is launched will bounce against the level's walls six times. On the sixth bounce the ball stops ready for the player to hit again. If the player runs out of shots (goes over par), the ball explodes and the player has to start the level over. If the player gets the ball into the hole, the player advances to the next level.

As the player progresses the levels get increasingly more difficult to play as new elements such as spikes and bouncy walls are introduced.

Reception 
Incidence received mixed reviews. Gamezebo gave the game 3.5 stars calling it a "beautiful and challenging minimalist action-puzzle game". They praised the game's simplicity and that the puzzles are "frustratingly challenging but nothing feels impossible" while criticizing the fact the game is sluggish on older devices and that "100 levels is impressive, but still doesn't quite feel like enough". TouchArcade gave the game 3.5 stars praising its "unique 'bounce' physics" while critiquing the fact that there are only 100 levels. Metacritic gave the game a Metascore of 67 (or mixed/average reviews).

References 

IOS-only games
IOS games